Lanah P (born 1959) is an LGBT English entertainer.

Previously billed as Alan Pellay, Al Pillay, Al-ana Pellay, and Lana Pellay, Pillay starred in The Comic Strip Presents and as Alex in the 1986 film Eat the Rich.

Early life
Pillay was born near the docks of Grimsby and was the youngest of six children; her mother was a cleaner of Bajan descent, while her father was an engineer on the fishing trawlers, and was of Indian descent.

Career

Working men's clubs
Pillay left school at fifteen and went to Manchester, where she befriended the Northern drag performers Bunny Lewis and Frank "Foo Foo" Lammar. Pillay impersonated Shirley Bassey, Eartha Kitt, Lena Horne, Cleo Laine and Dorothy Squires in full drag, with no microphone, and was booked into the working men's clubs throughout the North of England, as well as the cabaret club circuit.

Disco diva
During a lull in Pillay's drag career, while managing the Black Market Café in Levenshulme and renting a room from Coronation Street actor Alan Rothwell, Pillay was introduced to Kay Carroll and Mark E Smith of The Fall. Pillay formed his own band, the I Scream Pleasures, who subsequently appeared as guest support at Fall gigs.

Pillay also recorded with Adrian Sherwood and her dub label, On-U Sound, recording the track post punk or punk funk industrial music tune "Parasitic Machine" for a early compilation. The sound engineer was Mark Lusardi, who had previously worked with Creation Rebel.

Pillay metamorphosed into a disco diva as the hormone-popping transsexual Lana Pellay, dressed in costumes by her close friend Leigh Bowery, enjoying a top 40 single in Australia and New Zealand with "Pistol in My Pocket". She also accompanied Gary Clail on his 1991 hit "Human Nature", singing the couplet "Let the carnival begin... Every pleasure, every sin!"

TV and film career
While living in Notting Hill, west London, Pillay met Keith Allen, who invited Pillay to appear on the first programme aimed at a youth audience on the recently launched Channel 4 network. There, Pillay met his champion, Peter Richardson. The latter was an actor, comedian, writer and director for The Comic Strip Presents who wrote parts for her in the episodes  "Susie", "Gino", "The Bullshitters" and the feature-length film The Supergrass. Pillay played Ray in "Susie" (episode 8), Himself (as Alan Pellay) in "Gino: Full Story and Pics" (episode 10), Herself (as Alana Pellay) in The Bullshitters (episode 13), Mary (as Lana Pellay) in the film The Supergrass and Women's Clothing Shop Employee in "Consuela (Or 'The New Mrs Saunders')" (episode 14).

Richardson also wrote the lead part for Pillay in the 1986 feature film Eat the Rich. Following The Comic Strip, Pillay became a film critic on the ITV late night chat show Funky Bunker, alongside Craig Charles.

Theatre and cabaret
As Al Pillay, she performed in a one-person play, Glitter & Twisted, based on her life and written by Tim Fountain, which had its premiere at the Beckett Theater on 42nd Street as part of the first Manhattan Musical Theatre Festival. She also appeared in her own cabaret show, A Life in Song, at Pizza on the Park and the Café De Paris in London. Her cabaret performance has been released as a double CD. In 2012, she played the title role of the Welsh singer Dorothy Squires on stage in Mrs Roger Moore.

Discography (as Lana Pellay)

Singles
"Pistol in My Pocket" (1986) – UK No. 96, AUS No. 17, NZ No. 40
"I Can Make a Man Out of You" (1986)

References

External links
 Al Pillay's youtube channel "Lana's Story Land"
 Al Pillay's entry in IMDb

1959 births
English entertainers
Black British actresses
Living people
People from Grimsby
English people of Irish descent
English people of Trinidad and Tobago descent
English people of South African descent
English people of Spanish descent
English people of Sri Lankan descent
Actors from Lincolnshire
LGBT Black British people